The Basra International Hotel is a hotel on Shatt al-Arab bank in Al Ashar District, in Basrah, Iraq. 

The hotel was built in 1981 as the Basrah Sheraton Hotel & Casino. Sheraton severed ties with the hotel in 1991, at the time of the Gulf War, but the hotel continued using the name without permission for the next two decades until it closed after the Iraq War. It was renovated and reopened in 2010 under its current name.

See also
Royal Tulip Al Rasheed Hotel
Baghdad Hotel
Palestine Hotel

References

External links
 Official website

1981 establishments in Iraq
Hotels established in 1981
Hotel buildings completed in 1981
Hotels in Basra